Jari Ilola (born 24 November 1978) is a Finnish former professional footballer who played for Finnish clubs RoPS Rovaniemi, HJK Helsinki as well as Swedish club IF Elfsborg. At international level, he made 30 appearances scoring one goal for the Finland national team.

External links

1978 births
Living people
Sportspeople from Oulu
Finnish footballers
Association football midfielders
Finland international footballers
Veikkausliiga players
Allsvenskan players
Rovaniemen Palloseura players
Helsingin Jalkapalloklubi players
IF Elfsborg players
Finnish expatriate footballers
Finnish expatriate sportspeople in Sweden
Expatriate footballers in Sweden